Mala Gradusa  is a village in central Croatia, in the municipality of Sunja, Sisak-Moslavina County. It is located in the Banija region.

History

Demographics
According to the 2011 census, the village of Mala Gradusa has 20 inhabitants. This represents 14.49% of its pre-war population according to the 1991 census. 

According to the 1991 census, the village had a population of 138, with Serbs constituting the majority (129, 93,47%).

Notable natives and residents

References 

Populated places in Sisak-Moslavina County
Serb communities in Croatia